The 1999 Argentina rugby union tour of Scotland and Ireland  was a series of four matches played by the Argentina national rugby union team in August 1999, to prepare the team for the 1999 Rugby World Cup

Matches
Scores and results list Argentina's points tally first.

References

Sources

1999
1999
1999
1999 in Argentine rugby union
1999–2000 in Irish rugby union
1999–2000 in Scottish rugby union
History of rugby union matches between Argentina and Ireland